Tatum is an extinct town in Dade County, in the U.S. state of Georgia.

History
The community was named after Colonel Robert H. "Uncle Bob" Tatum, an early settler and afterward state legislator.

See also
List of ghost towns in Georgia

References

Geography of Dade County, Georgia
Ghost towns in Georgia (U.S. state)